London SS is a British rock group founded in March 1975 by drummer Geir Wade, bassist John Brown, guitarist Mick Jones, and guitarist Eunan Brady (formerly of the Hollywood Brats). They later became associated with the then new punk rock scene when the Sex Pistols broke in early 1976. In 2012 Brady put together a new lineup, featuring himself along with Jimi McDonald, Taj Sagoo, Michael Kane, and Andi Emm.

History
The origin of the name "London SS" is disputable. Geir Wade claims to have been the first to propose it:

The group's name caused disquiet in some quarters, because "SS" was generally understood to refer to the Schutzstaffel, the infamous paramilitary force of Nazi Germany which ran the Nazi concentration camps and perpetrated war crimes and atrocities all over Nazi-occupied Europe. This came to haunt Mick Jones (who is Jewish) when The Clash became Britain's premier left-wing political band. When questioned about the name, Tony James stated:

The London SS recruited Kelvin Cyril Blacklock to front their band. Blacklock's arrival led to Geir Wade and Mick Jones's departures. The band then changed its name to Violent Luck.

The second lineup of The London SS started with Blacklock and James.
The band spent most of their short history auditioning potential members. Besides Blacklock and James, guitarist Brian James (no relation to Tony James) was the only other semi-permanent member at this time. Other musicians who played with them included Matt Dangerfield and Casino Steel, then members of The Hollywood Brats, who would later go on to play in The Boys.

Recordings
London SS's only recording was a demo featuring James, Jones, James, and Hot. Musically, they played straightforward rock 'n' roll and covered 1960s R&B. An example of this is their song "1–2 Crush on You", which was later recorded by The Clash.

Later bands featuring members of The London SS
Brian James and Rat Scabies joined Johnny Moped guitarist Ray Burns and backed up music journalist Nick Kent in the shortlived Subterraneans. James and Scabies later formed The Damned. Tony James joined the band Chelsea with Billy Idol and the two later started Generation X. According to Chelsea drummer John Towe,

Jones and Simonon teamed up with Joe Strummer and founded The Clash. Ultimately, The London SS members were more famous for what they did later than they were for anything that they accomplished during the band's existence. As described by music critic Dave Thompson, the band is "regarded as the testing ground-cum-meeting place for what became a who's-who of punk".

References

The Clash
English punk rock groups
Protopunk groups
Musical groups from London
Musical groups established in 1975
Musical groups disestablished in 1976
Musical quartets